Tombak-e Pain (also Romanized as Tombak-e Pā’īn; also known as Tombak and Tumbak) is a village in Howmeh Rural District, in the Central District of Minab County, Hormozgan Province, Iran. At the 2006 census, its population was 672, in 133 families.

References 

Populated places in Minab County